Norway has participated in the qualification for 18 FIFA World Cup tournaments and reached the finals three times, in 1938, 1994 and 1998.

Record at the FIFA World Cup

*Draws include knockout matches decided via penalty shoot-out

By Match

Record by Opponent

Match records

1938 FIFA World Cup

Squad

First round

1994 FIFA World Cup

Squad

Group stage

1998 FIFA World Cup

Squad

Group stage

Round of 16

Player records

Most appearances

Top goalscorers

References

 
Countries at the FIFA World Cup
World Cup